Benjamín "Cananea" Reyes Chávez (February 18, 1937 — November 11, 1991) was a Mexican professional baseball player and manager who spent one season, 1981, as a coach for the Seattle Mariners of Major League Baseball.

Born in Nacozari in Sonora, Mexico, Reyes was a third baseman, outfielder and pitcher during his six-year playing career in Mexican minor league baseball, including two seasons with the Charros de Jalisco of the Mexican League.  His managing career began in 1968 and in 1971 he became pilot of the Charros for three seasons, before switching in 1974 to the Diablos Rojos del México, whom he managed for 16 years (1974–80; 1983–91) and had only one losing campaign.  In 20 years as a Triple-A Mexican League manager, Reyes compiled a winning percentage of .568.

Reyes' one season in MLB was the strike-shortened 1981 campaign. He was named the Mariners' third-base coach by Seattle skipper Maury Wills, but Wills was fired early in the year, on May 6, 1981, and replaced by Rene Lachemann. Reyes finished the season, then returned to the Mexican League for the remainder of his career. He won five championships as a Mexican League manager.

He died in Hermosillo, in Sonora, from cancer at the age of 54. The following year he was inducted into the Mexican Professional Baseball Hall of Fame.

References

1937 births
1991 deaths
Baseball players from Sonora
Caribbean Series managers
Charros de Jalisco players
Indios de Ciudad Juárez (minor league) players
Mexican Baseball Hall of Fame inductees
Major League Baseball third base coaches
Mexican League baseball managers
Minor league baseball managers
Piratas de Campeche players
Seattle Mariners coaches
People from Nacozari de García Municipality